The 2014 South Dakota Coyotes football team represented the University of South Dakota in the 2014 NCAA Division I FCS football season. They were led by third year head coach Joe Glenn and played their home games in the DakotaDome. They were a member of the Missouri Valley Football Conference. They finished the season 2–10, 0–8 in MVFC play to finish in last place.

Schedule

Source: Schedule

References

South Dakota
South Dakota Coyotes football seasons
South Dakota Coyotes football